This article will show a list of the top five least used stations of Great Britain in the year stated. A least used station is a station that received the fewest entries/exits (described as a passenger) as defined by Office of Rail and Road (ORR) in a given timeframe. These statistics are released by the ORR every November, December or January.

Overview 
This table shows the top least used stations of every period covered in this page.

Publicity 

The publicity around these stations is fuelled by the nature of how unusual they are. Railway enthusiasts are known to visit them for either being able to say they have been there, or in order to boost the station's statistics up to make it more used. Geoff Marshall, a YouTuber known for his railway-related content, has a series dedicated to visiting these stations.

There has also been news coverage on a few of the least used stations, for example Berney Arms had an ITV reporter sent to cover it when it was announced in the 2019/20 period.

Statistics

Period between 2021 and 2022

Zero stations 

The only station to receive zero passengers in this period was Heathrow Terminal 4, which was due to its closure between 9 May 2020 and 14 June 2022 due to of the COVID-19 pandemic.

Stations above zero 

The least used station in this statistic period was Elton & Orston, which is in that position for the first time. Interestingly, Kirton Lindsey maintained its position at number 5 for the second year running. Stanlow & Thornton had its services suspended in February 2022 (before the end of the year) due to safety concerns about the footbridge. Teesside Airport's services were suspended after the end of the year, and - whilst this did not affect these statistics - this may affect its passenger numbers for next year. Other than Heathrow, the statistics for this period showed the top five least used stations to be:

Period between 2020 and 2021

COVID-19 
The COVID-19 pandemic has had a great effect on the railway network in Great Britain. Usage fell approximately 78% in the period between April 2020 and March 2021. Some stations were even closed for long periods of time due to inability to social distance, caused by short platforms.

Zero stations 

There were six stations which were used by zero people in this period, those being: Abererch, Beasdale, Llanbedr, Sampford Courtenay, Stanlow and Thornton, and Sugar Loaf. Abererch, Llanbedr, and Sugar Loaf were some of a few stations closed during the pandemic due to social distancing measures. Sampford Courtenay was last served by Great Western Railway in summer 2019, and had all of its services withdrawn in December 2019 not long before the Dartmoor Heritage Railway went into administration, and no trains have served it since. Beasdale and Stanlow & Thornton had low passenger usage pre-pandemic, so the restrictions impacted this even further. These stations will not be shown in the table for this period, but will be shown in the overview table.

Stations above zero 
The least used station in this period (other than zero stations) was Teesside Airport, see period 2013 and 2014 for further information on this station. The second least used was Tygwyn in Gwynedd. Pre-pandemic, this station got around 2000 passengers annually. However, it was closed during the pandemic due to social distancing measures, and when it was re-opened it never gained back its previous form. This is the same for most stations which fell dramatically in this period. Other than zero stations, the statistics for this period showed the top five least used stations to be:

Period between 2019 and 2020 

Due to the stats for this period finishing recording in March, this release was not completely affected by the COVID-19 pandemic. The least used station in the whole country for this period was Berney Arms, a small request stop on a lesser-used line between Norwich and Great Yarmouth. It dropped by approximately 90% from its statistics last year, due to it being closed for 15 months for signalling work. The statistics for this period showed the top five least used stations to be:

Period between 2018 and 2019 

The least used station in this period was a tie, the title being taken by both Stanlow and Thornton and Denton. Denton has always been very underused, being on a line that only gets one 2-way journey on a Saturday only. Stanlow and Thornton used to get an hourly service in the 1980s, but it has now been reduced to two trains in each direction a day. The statistics for this period showed the top five least used stations to be:

Period between 2017 and 2018 

The least used station in this period was Redcar British Steel. It suffered a massive drop in passengers in this period, going from above 1000 passengers in 2014/15 dropping to just 40 in this period. This is due to the steel works which this station served being closed, and the station having no access other than from the train. The station itself had all of its services suspended in December 2019. The statistics for this period showed the top five least used stations to be:

Period between 2016 and 2017 

The least used station in this period was Barry Links. Originally opened by the Dundee and Arbroath Railway, Barry Links is located on the Dundee–Aberdeen line just east of the town of Barry. Its always been fairly unused due to a very sparse train service (one train a day in each direction). The statistics for this period showed the top five least used stations to be:

Period between 2015 and 2016 

The least used station in this period was Shippea Hill. Originally opened as 'Mildenhall Road' in 1845, it has since been through two name changes; one in 1885 which saw it named as 'Burnt Fen', and again in 1904 where it was renamed to its current name, Shippea Hill. Its located on the Breckland line, approximately six miles west of Ely. Its location is the reason of it being so least used. The statistics for this period show the top five least used stations to be:

Period between 2014 and 2015 

The least used station in this period was Shippea Hill (It had this honour three times in a row). See above for background information on this station. The second least used was Coombe Junction Halt, a station which always seems to find itself in the top five or ten. This is due to its location (on a small industrial estate near Liskeard) and its sparse service. The statistics for this period show the top five least used stations to be:

Period between 2013 and 2014 

The least used station in this period was Teesside Airport (It had this honour four times in a row). It is a very sparsely served station on the Tees Valley line. It only receives one train a week as of the December 2020 timetable coming into effect. It has two platforms but only one is used due to there being only one service a week. It serves Teesside International Airport, which by airport-standards is also fairly under-used. The statistics for this period showed the top five least used stations to be:

Period between 2012 and 2013 

The least used station in this period was Teesside Airport. It had this honour four times in a row. See above for background information on the station. The second least used was Coombe Junction Halt, a small halt on the Looe Valley Line. It only gets four trains a day (two in each direction) as most trains reverse at the level crossing around 50 ft down the track. See Looe Valley Line for more information. The statistics for this period showed the top five least used stations to be:

Period between 2011 and 2012 

The least used station in this period was Teesside Airport. It had this honour four times in a row. See above for background information on the station. The second least used station was Dorking West. The only reason it gets this title is due to a supposed anomalous result caused by a 'computer predicting system'. This station would usually see around 50,000 passengers each year. The statistics for this period showed the top five least used stations to be:

Period between 2010 and 2011 

The least used station in this period was Teesside Airport. It had this honour four times in a row. See above for background information on this station. The second least used station was Dorking West. This station got second place twice in a row (see above) due to a supposed anomalous results caused by a 'computer predicting system'. See above for background information on this station. The statistics for this period showed the top five least used stations to be:

Period between 2009 and 2010 

The least used station in this period was Coombe Junction Halt, a small halt on the Looe Valley Line. Owing to its sparse service of four trains a day, and its location on an industrial estate near Liskeard, this station is always very under used. More background information on this station is available in the section for the period between 2012 and 2013. The statistics for this period showed the top five least used stations to be:

Period between 2008 and 2009 

The least used station in this period was Teesside Airport. Background information for this station is available in the section for the 2013 and 2014 period. The second least used station in this period was Denton. Located on the Stockport–Stalybridge line, it only receives two services (one to Stalybridge and one to Stockport) on a Saturday. Owing to this, this station is always hovering around the top five, but very rarely actually going top. The statistics for this period showed the top five least used stations to be:

Period between 2007 and 2008 

The least used station in this period was Crosskeys. The only reason it earnt this title was due to the station only being reopened during this period, and there was not enough time for the station to get a proper usage. It is located on the Ebbw Valley Railway in Wales and is served with one train an hour in each direction on Monday to Saturday, and approximately one train every two hours on a Sunday. The statistics for this period showed the top five least used stations to be:

Period between 2006 and 2007 

The least used station in this period was Tyndrum Lower. One of two stations in the small village of Tyndrum, this one is located on the West Highland Line. With only six trains calling at this station on Monday-Saturday, and the local village only having a population of 167, this station is always rather unused, now getting around 5,000 passengers modern-day. The statistics for this period showed the top five least used stations to be:

Period between 2005 and 2006 

The least used station in this period was Gainsborough Central. It had this honour twice in a row. The station earned this title due to its sparse Saturday-only service which were introduced in British Rail in 1993. Located on the Sheffield–Lincoln line it only three of these Saturday only trains. It has since gained a better service after a long campaign for better service on the line finally succeeded. The statistics for this period showed the top five least used stations to be:

Period between 2004 and 2005 

The least used station in this period was Gainsborough Central. It had this honour twice in a row. See above for background information on this station. The second least used station in this period was Watford West. Despite the station being closed by this time, 25 people still purchased a ticket to this station, causing the statistics to count it. The station closed in 2002, the line itself being closed a year later. See Watford West for more information. The statistics for this period showed the top five least used stations to be:

Period between 2003 and 2004 
Statistics for this period were not produced due to a change in the methodology used.

Period between 2002 and 2003 

The least used station in this period was Barry Links and Gainsborough Central. For background information on these stations, see period 2004 and 2005 for Gainsborough Central and period 2016 and 2017 for Barry Links. The third least used station for this period was Golf Street. Located on the Dundee–Aberdeen line, the station only gets three trains a day, and to this day it remains in the top five least used stations in Scotland. The statistics for this period showed the top five least used stations to be:

Period between 2001 and 2002 

The least used station in this period was Beauly. It only gained this title as the station was opened during this period, so it did not have enough time to gain a significant number of passengers. Its located on the Far North Line between Inverness and Muir of Ord. The statistics for this period showed the top five least used stations to be:

Period between 2000 and 2001 

The least used station in this period was Buckenham. This station is rather unique in the way that it only receives services on weekend. This is not unheard of but also not common. It has this irregular service pattern due to its popularity with walkers and bird-spotters as it is located next to the RSPB Buckenham Marshes and RSPB Strumpshaw Fen. The statistics for this period showed the top five least used stations to be:

Period between 1999 and 2000 

The least used station for this period was Ditton, despite having no services since 1994. The reason it still ranks in this period despite it having no services is because someone purchased a ticket to and from this station. Unusually, this period, a station was created in the data under the name of "King's Cross St Pancras" which recorded only 41 passengers despite the usage for both stations individually being many thousands of times greater. The statistics for this period showed the top five least used stations to be:

See also 

 Parliamentary train
 Closure by stealth
 Stations still open but with no services

References

External links 

 Estimates of station usage, released by the Office of Rail and Road.
 Archived Estimates, on National Archives (for periods from 1997 to 2017)

Notes 

Least used
Rail transport-related lists of superlatives